William Henry Rupertus (November 14, 1889 – March 25, 1945) was a major general in the United States Marine Corps, who commanded the famed 1st Marine Division in the Pacific in World War II and also authored the USMC Rifleman's Creed.

Military career 
Rupertus began his military career immediately after graduating high school, serving in the District of Columbia National Guard from 1907 to 1910. Originally, he intended to serve as a cutter captain in the United States Revenue Cutter Service, the earlier version of the modern U.S. Coast Guard. He was accepted to the U.S. Revenue Cutter School of Instruction on April 28, 1910. He graduated academically second in his class on May 15, 1913, but failed the physical examination. Because he was physically unqualified, he resigned from the U.S. Revenue Cutter Service on June 18, 1913.

However, his excellent marksmanship led to his being recruited by the Marine Corps. He accepted a commission in November 1913, then attended the Marine Corps Officers School, graduating first in his class of 1915. Rupertus served on the Marine Corps rifle team, earning the Distinguished Marksman badge and winning a number of shooting matches.

Rupertus was serving aboard the battleship  when the United States entered World War I and was subsequently recalled up to the U.S. to command a detachment of Marines headed for Port-au-Prince, Haiti. Rupertus served in Haiti for three years until after the war, when he was sent to staff officer training and then made Inspector of Target Practice in the Operations and Training Division at Marine Corps Headquarters. In 1929 he commanded a detachment of the 4th Marines in Peking, China.

In July 1937, Rupertus was a battalion commander in the 4th Marines when the Japanese attacked Shanghai in the Second Sino-Japanese War.

During World War II, as commanding officer of the Marine barracks at San Diego, he wrote the Marine Corps Rifleman's Creed right after Pearl Harbor was bombed. He penned the Rifleman's Creed with the intent of encouraging expert marksmanship and Marines' trust in their weapons. In March 1942, he served as assistant division commander of the 1st Marine Division under Major General Alexander Vandegrift in New River, North Carolina to assist in the formation and training of the First Marine Division.

Rupertus commanded the Landing Task Force Organization which captured the islands of Tulagi, Gavutu and Tanambogo in the Guadalcanal campaign. After Vandegrift left the division in 1943, Rupertus took command. He led the 1st Marine Division during the Battle of Cape Gloucester and the Battle of Peleliu.

In November 1944, Major General Rupertus became the commandant of the Marine Corps Schools at Quantico, Virginia. His tenure was short, however, as he died of a heart attack on March 25, 1945, just four months later. He is buried in Arlington National Cemetery.

Awards and honors 
Major General Rupertus' decorations included: 

In 1945, the U.S. Navy destroyer  was named in his honor.

Rupertus also received the Faciat Georgius commemorative medal for service on Guadalcanal.

Navy Cross citation
Citation:

The President of the United States of America takes pleasure in presenting the Navy Cross to Brigadier General William H. Rupertus (MCSN: 0-852), United States Marine Corps, for extraordinary heroism and distinguished service as Commander of a Landing Force Task Organization composed of the FIRST Raider Battalion, the Second Battalion, FIFTH Marines, and the FIRST Parachute Battalion, in action against enemy Japanese forces during the attack on the Solomon Islands, 7 to 9 August 1942. Despite the comparatively short time afforded him in which to organize his command, Brigadier General Rupertus quickly and efficiently assembled a provisional staff, and with their aid, his forces landed on Tulagi, Gavutu and Tanambogo, British Solomon Islands, and successfully assaulted a series of strategically disposed and strongly defended enemy positions. Personally conducting the operation and dauntlessly exposing himself to enemy fire whenever necessary, he displayed exceptional courage and cool determination which served as an inspiration to the officers and men of his command. His bold and judicious decisions and his high professional attainments contributed effectively to the success of our operations in the Tulagi Area and his conduct throughout was in keeping with the highest traditions of the United States Naval Service.

Books on General Rupertus 
Old Breed General, co-authored by Don Brown, author of multiple books on the U.S. Military and Amy Rupertus Peacock, who is General Rupertus's granddaughter, published in 2022 by Rowman & Littlefield through Stackpole Books.

Notes

References

External links 

 

1889 births
1945 deaths
Military personnel from Washington, D.C.
United States Marine Corps World War II generals
Burials at Arlington National Cemetery
Recipients of the Navy Cross (United States)
United States Distinguished Marksman
People from Washington, D.C.
Recipients of the Distinguished Service Medal (US Army)
United States Marine Corps generals
Recipients of the Navy Distinguished Public Service Award
United States Marine Corps personnel of World War I